Rock Solid is the 13th studio album by the Commodores, released in 1988. At this time in the band's career, hits were no longer forthcoming, and this album failed to enter the Billboard albums chart. The single, "Solitaire", reached No. 51 on the R&B chart. It is the last of the band's albums with keyboard player and founding member Milan Williams, who left after a dispute about playing in South Africa.

Track listing

Personnel 
Adapted from AllMusic.

 Gerald Albright – saxophone solo (11)
 Ruben Alvarez – percussion (5)
 Dave Battelene – guitar (10)
 Jim Blair – overdubs (9)
 Ray Blair – engineer (9)
 Erich Bulling – electronic programming (6)
 Carl Caldwell – backing vocals (6, 8)
 Chris Cameron – arrangements (5), keyboards (5), programming (5)
 Terry Christian – engineer (6)
 Shawn Christopher – backing vocals (5)
 David Cochrane – soprano saxophone solo (3)
 Vinnie Colaiuta – drums (5)
 Paulinho Da Costa – percussion (2, 3)
 Donna Davidson – backing vocals (11)
 Lynn Davis – backing vocals (6)
 George Duke – Synclavier strings (8)
 Steve Eisen – tenor saxophone (5)
 Ramsey Embick – electronic programming (7, 9)
 Rick Emerson – additional keyboards (11)
 Ray Fuller – guitar (2, 8)
 Jo Anne Geffen – management
 John Gilutin – acoustic piano (3)
 Ed Greene – additional drums (11)
 Portia Griffith – backing vocals (4)
 Randy Hall – backing vocals (9, 10)
 Stewart Hanley – engineer (7, 9), keyboards (7)
 Mark Harman – assistant engineer (2)
 Steve Harvey – producer (1, 2, 4), electronic programming (1, 2, 4), additional keyboards (1, 4), vocal arrangements (1, 4), arrangements (2), backing vocals (4)
 Howard Hewett – mixing (8), producer (8), vocal arrangements (8)
 Marva Hicks – backing vocals (2)
 Harold Hudson – keyboards (10)
 Dann Huff – guitar (11)
 Paul Jackson, Jr. – guitar (1, 3, 4)
 Josie James – backing vocals (6, 8)
 Cliff Jones – engineer (8)
 Shirley King – Spanish translation (2)
 William King – guitar, keyboards, trumpet, backing vocals (1, 9, 10), producer (3, 5, 11), mixing (3)
 Michael Landau – guitar (3, 6)
 Jeff Lorber – additional keyboards (1, 4), grand piano (2)
 Jeff Lorenzo – engineer (1, 2, 4), backing vocals (4)
 Kevin Mahoney – Synclavier (6)
 Alan Meyerson – engineer (1-4, 11), mixing (1-5, 7, 8, 9)
 Isaac Morris – drums (10)
 J.D. Nicholas – keyboards, backing vocals (1, 5-11), lead vocals (3, 6-10), associate producer (7), vocal arrangements (7, 8, 9), producer (8, 9), mixing (9)
 Tom Nikosey – art direction
 Michael Omartian – drums (6), keyboards (6), producer (6)
 Walter Orange – drums, keyboards, vocal arrangements (1, 4), lead vocals (1, 2, 4, 5, 6, 11), backing vocals (1, 2, 6, 9, 10), producer (1, 2, 11), arrangements (2), electronic programming (2, 4), additional vocals (10)
 Gene Page – arrangements (3)
 Mark Partis – mixing assistant (5), assistant engineer (11)
 Elliott Peters – assistant engineer (5)
 Alejo Poveda – additional percussion (5)
 Tony Prendatt – keyboards (3), producer (3, 11), executive producer (5), additional keyboards (11)
 Sheldon Reynolds – guitar (7, 9), backing vocals (7)
 Howie Rice – producer (7, 9)
 John "J.R." Robinson – drums (3)
 David Rosenberg – additional percussion (5)
 Micajah Ryan – assistant engineer (3, 9, 11)
 Monty Seward – additional keyboards (8), electronic programming (8)
 Marti Sharron – associate producer (6)
 Alfie Silas – backing vocals (9)
 Tyron Stanton – bass guitar (10)
 Mia Tabares – backing vocals (8, 9)
 Sandy Torano – backing vocals (5), guitar (5), arrangements (5), producer (5), keyboards
 Tony Volante – engineer (11), mixing (11)
 John Van Nest – engineer (11)
 George Warner – engineer (5)
 Freddie "Ready Freddie" Washington – bass guitar (3, 11)
 Sherri Wells – backing vocals (9)
 Karyn White – backing vocals (1, 2, 4, 10, 11)
 Norman Whitfield, Jr. – engineer (7, 9)
 Larry Williams – saxophone (6)
 Milan Williams – guitar, keyboards, backing vocals (1, 10), producer (10)
 Hawk Wolinski – producer (10)

References

Commodores albums
1988 albums
Polydor Records albums